Fanta Diagouraga (born 30 June 2000) is a Congolese handball player for french league club HBC Celles-sur-Belle and the Congolese national team.

She represented Congo at the 2021 World Women's Handball Championship in Spain.

She was the Division 2 Féminine topscorer during its , scoring 181 goals for Noisy-le-Grand HB.

Achievements

International 
 African Women's Handball Championship:
  3rd in 2022

References

2000 births
Living people
Congolese female handball players